This is a list of commercial banks in Burkina Faso.

 Bank of Africa (BOA)
 Banque Atlantique Burkina Faso
 Banque de l'Habitat du Burkina Faso
 Banque Régionale de Solidarité
 Société Générale de Banques au Burkina (SG-BB)
 Banque Internationale du Burkina (BIB)
 Banque Sahélo-Saharienne pour l'Investissement et le Commerce (BSIC)
 Vista Bank Burkina (formerly BICIAB)
 Banque Commerciale du Burkina	
 Ecobank Burkina
 Banque Agricole et Commerciale du Burkina
 United Bank for Africa
 Coris Bank

External links
 Website of Central Bank of West African States

See also

 Central Bank of West African States
 Economy of Burkina Faso
 List of banks in Africa
 List of companies based in Burkina Faso

References

 
Banks
Burkina Faso
Burkina Faso